Playin' Around is a compilation album by Play. Also known by the title Playin' Around the World, it contains about an hour of video segments featuring the members of Play - Anaïs Lameche, Anna Sundstrand, Faye Hamlin and Rosie Munter - as they perform a set of songs in concert, rehearse their music videos, discuss their life performing and living on their tour bus, and prepare for their new album Replay by recording tracks in the studio.  The disc also includes several Play music videos in full length.

In some editions, the product is available as a 2-disc set including both the video format presentation and a music CD containing the seven tracks featured on Play's 2002 self-titled debut CD.

Track listing
DVD
"Intro"
"Showtime!"
"Life on the Road"
"Let's Dance"
"Sing It Girls, Pt. 1"
"Sing It Girls, Pt. 2"
"Surf's Up"
"Making of Us Against the World"
"Us Against the World"
"Making of M.A.S.T.E.R., Pt. 2"
"M.A.S.T.E.R., Pt. 2"  (F. Lil Fizz)
"I'm Gonna Make You Love Me" (live)
"Cinderella"
"Outro"
"Credits"

CD
"I'm Gonna Make You Love Me" – 3:06
"Us Against the World" – 3:41
"Cinderella" – 3:36
"Hopelessly Devoted" – 3:22
"Is It Love – 3:33
"I Don't Get Down Like That" – 3:44
"Disco Hippie" – 3:22

Personnel
Faye Hamlin (lead vocals)
Anna Sundstrand (minor vocals)
Anaïs Lameche (lead vocals)
Rosie Munter (minor vocals)

2003 albums
Play (Swedish group) albums
Albums produced by Ric Wake
2003 live albums
2003 video albums
Live video albums